Imesha Dulani (born 20 January 2002) is a Sri Lankan cricketer who plays for the Sri Lanka women's national cricket team. In October 2021, she was named in Sri Lanka's team for the 2021 Women's Cricket World Cup Qualifier tournament in Zimbabwe, one of three uncapped players in Sri Lanka's squad. On 23 November 2021, she played in Sri Lanka's first match of the tournament, against the Netherlands. In January 2022, she was named as one of four reserve players in Sri Lanka's team for the 2022 Commonwealth Games Cricket Qualifier tournament in Malaysia. In May 2022, she was named in Sri Lanka's squad for their tour to Pakistan.

References

External links

2002 births
Living people
Sri Lankan women cricketers
Place of birth missing (living people)